Gregory Joseph Gillespie (November 29, 1936 – April 26, 2000) was an American magic realist painter.

Life and career

He was born in Roselle Park, New Jersey. After graduating from high school, he became a nondegree student at Cooper Union in New York. In 1959 he married Frances Cohen (1939–1998), who was also an artist, and the following year they moved to San Francisco where Gillespie studied at the San Francisco Art Institute.

In 1962 he received the first of two Fulbright-Hays grants for travel to Italy to study the work of Masaccio. He lived and worked in Florence for two years and in Rome for six years, studying the works of such Renaissance masters as Carpaccio, Mantegna, and Carlo Crivelli, who was a particular favorite of Gillespie. During this time, he was awarded three Chester Dale Fellowships and a Louis Comfort Tiffany grant. In 1971 he was elected into the National Academy of Design as an Associate member and became a full Academician in 1994.

He had his first solo show in 1966, at the Forum Gallery in New York. In 1970 he returned to the United States, where he settled in Williamsburg, Massachusetts. He exhibited in several Whitney Biennials, and in 1977 the Hirshhorn Museum organized a touring retrospective of his work.

Gillespie became known for meticulously painted figurative paintings, landscapes, and self portraits, often with a fantastical element. Many of his early works were made by painting over photographs cut from newspapers or magazines, transforming the scenes through photographic collage, and by adding imaginary elements. In his later work, he abandoned his early fascination with creating hyper-realized realistic imagery, instead focusing on a looser and more expressive style.  He often combined media in an unorthodox way to create shrine-like assemblages.  In 1983, he and his first wife, Frances, divorced.

He was found dead by his second wife, Peggy, in his studio in Belchertown, Massachusetts, apparently a suicide by hanging, on April 26, 2000.

In December 2022 his son Vincent Gillespie, a resident of Athol, Massachusetts, was found guilty of assaulting law enforcement during the January 6, 2021, Capitol breach. Prior to his conviction, Vincent Gillespie had waged a lengthy legal battle against his stepmother to gain control of his father's paintings.

Collections
Gillespie's work is in the collections of the Whitney Museum, the Arkansas Arts Center, and the Butler Institute of American Art, among others. The Hirshhorn Museum has at least fourteen works by Gillespie in its collection (see external links).

Notes

References

Lerner, Abram (1977). Gregory Gillespie. Washington: [Published for the] Hirshhorn Museum and Sculpture Garden, Smithsonian Institution, by Smithsonian Institution Press.

Further reading
Gregory Gillespie: Paintings (Italy 1962-1970). Published at Studio Tipografico, Rome, by Forum Gallery, New York. 1970. 55 reproductions, no text except Gillespie's short introduction: "Too many words have been written about art and artists. I have decided that this book should consist of reproductions alone." (Rome. January, 1970)
Keyes, Donald D.; Belz, Carl; Carr, Rani M. (1999). A Unique American Vision: Paintings by Gregory Gillespie. Georgia Museum of Art. . Exhibition catalog.

External links

Askart.com's main page on Gillespie, with color image
Arkansas Arts Center: page with bio and information on two works by Gillespie in the Arkansas Arts Center's collection; with access to two color images
Hirshhorn Museum: page with information on fourteen works by Gillespie in the museum's collection, including several color images
Artcyclopedia on Gregory Gillespie, with links to color images of works by Gillespie in various museums, including the Fine Arts Museums of San Francisco, the Hirshhorn Museum and Sculpture Garden, the Museum of Fine Arts Boston, and the Smithsonian American Art Museum
Portrait of Gregory Gillespie by Barbara Swan, oil on canvas, 1979

1936 births
2000 deaths
20th-century American painters
American male painters
Artists who committed suicide
People from Roselle Park, New Jersey
2000 suicides
20th-century American male artists